Acacia tenuispica is a tree or shrub belonging to the genus Acacia and the subgenus Juliflorae that is endemic to north western Australia.

Description
It has glabrous and prominently ribbed branchlets that have small rounded protuberances Band are angled towards the apices. Like most species of Acacia it has phyllodes rather than true leaves. The thin phyllodes sometimes have small rounded projections on their surfaces and have an asymmetrical narrowly elliptic shape. It blooms from May to July producing yellow flowers. The woody red seed pods that form after flowering have a narrowly oblong shape that narrows toward the base.

Distribution
It is native to an area in the Kimberley region of Western Australia where it is found in the catchment are of the Prince Regent River and east of Walcott Inlet and also in the catchment area of the Drysdale River where it is situated in a variety of habitat mostly around sandstone as a part of Eucalyptus woodland communities.

See also
List of Acacia species

References

tenuispica
Acacias of Western Australia
Taxa named by Bruce Maslin
Plants described in 1983